Cryptandra imbricata is a flowering plant in the family Rhamnaceae and is endemic to the southwest of Western Australia. It is a spreading shrub with spiny, interlaced branchlets, narrowly oblong to linear leaves and spike-like clusters of white, tube-shaped flowers.

Description
The edges of the leaves are turned down or rolled under, sometimes concealing the hairy white lower surface. The flowers are surrounded by 11 to 14 broadly egg-shaped to oblong bracts. Flowering occurs from July to September, followed by fruit that is partly hidden inside the floral tube.

Taxonomy and naming
Cryptandra imbricata was first formally described in 2007 by Barbara Lynette Rye in the journal Nuytsia from specimens collected by Alison Marjorie Ashby north of Mullewa in 1969. The specific epithet (imbricata ) means "overlapping", referring to the bracts at the base of the flowers.

Distribution and habitat
This cryptandra mainly grows on red sandy clay in the Avon Wheatbelt, Murchison and Yalgoo bioregions of south-western Western Australia.

Conservation status
This cryptandra is listed as "not threatened" by the Western Australian Government Department of Biodiversity, Conservation and Attractions.

References

imbricata
Rosales of Australia
Flora of Western Australia
Plants described in 2007
Taxa named by Barbara Lynette Rye